Ladenburg station is a railway station in the municipality of Ladenburg, located in Baden-Württemberg, Germany.

References

Railway stations in Baden-Württemberg
Buildings and structures in Ladenburg
Railway stations in Germany opened in 1846